The 1977 Liberty Bowl was a college football postseason bowl game played in Memphis, Tennessee, on December 19, 1977. In the 19th edition of the Liberty Bowl, the Nebraska Cornhuskers of the Big Eight Conference rallied to defeat the North Carolina Tar Heels of the Atlantic Coast Conference, 21–17.

Game summary
North Carolina led by ten points after three quarters, but was outscored, 14–0, in the fourth quarter as Randy Garcia came off of the Husker bench and completed all three of his passes, two for touchdowns. It was the eighth bowl victory in nine seasons for Nebraska; they remained at twelfth in the final AP poll, and North Carolina slipped to seventeenth.

Scoring
First quarter
No scoring

Second quarter
North Carolina – Brooks Williams 12 pass from Matt Kupec (Tom Biddle kick), 13:52 
Nebraska – Dodie Donnell 15 run (Billy Todd kick), 11:00
North Carolina – Bob Loomis 10 pass from Kupec (Biddle kick), 3:11

Third quarter
North Carolina – FG Biddle 47, 4:17

Fourth quarter
Nebraska – Curtis Craig 10 pass from Randy Garcia (Todd kick), 10:51
Nebraska – Tim Smith 34 pass from Garcia (Todd kick), 3:16

Source:

Statistics
{| class=wikitable style="text-align:center"
! Statistics !!  Nebraska !! North  Carolina  
|-
| align=left|First downs || 21 || 17
|-
| align=left|Rushes–yards|| 52–206 || 55–169
|-
| align=left|Passing yards || 161 || 93
|-
| align=left|Passes || 14–17–0 || 8–13–1
|-
| align=left|Total yards || 367 || 262
|-
| align=left|Punts–average || 3–37|| 3–43
|-
| align=left|Fumbles–lost ||4–2|| 3–2
|-
| align=left|Turnovers by|| 2|| 3
|-
| align=left|Penalties–yards ||2–10|| 5–35
|}
Source:

References

Liberty Bowl
Liberty Bowl
Nebraska Cornhuskers football bowl games
North Carolina Tar Heels football bowl games
Liberty Bowl
December 1977 sports events in the United States